Eilert Waldemar Preben Ramm (4 May 1769 – 15 March 1837) was a Norwegian military officer and representative at the Norwegian Constitutional Assembly in 1814.

Background
Eilert Ramm was born at the village of Furnes at Ringsaker in Hedmark, Norway.  Ramm first joined the Zealand Light Dragon Regiment (sjællandske lette dragonregimentet ) in 1787. He rose through the ranks, and was later First Lieutenant and Captain of the cavalry in 1808.

Career
He represented Søndenfjeldske Dragon-Regiment at the Norwegian Constituent Assembly at Eidsvold in 1814. He was one of the two representative from  Søndenfjeldske Dragon-Regiment  together with Peder Paulsen Balke . He belonged to the independence party (Selvstendighetspartiet).

Family life
Eilert Waldemar Preben Ramm was married twice. He was the grandfather of Carl With, Commanding General of the Norwegian Army and great-grandfather of the artist Gabriel Kielland.

References

Related reading
Holme Jørn (2014) De kom fra alle kanter - Eidsvollsmennene og deres hus  (Oslo: Cappelen Damm) 

1769 births
1837 deaths
People from Furnes, Norway
Norwegian Army personnel
Norwegian military personnel of the Napoleonic Wars
Fathers of the Constitution of Norway